Ethylic is an adjective for a molecule containing an ethyl group. It may refer to:

 Ethylic acid, also known as acetic acid
 Ethylic alcohol, also known as ethanol